Richard Stockton is a marble sculpture depicting the American lawyer, jurist, legislator of the same name by Henry Kirke Brown (completed by Henry Kirke Bush-Brown), installed in the United States Capitol's crypt, in Washington, D.C., as part of the National Statuary Hall Collection. The statue was donated by the U.S. state of New Jersey in 1888.

References

External links
 

1888 establishments in Washington, D.C.
1888 sculptures
Sculptures by Henry Kirke Brown
Marble sculptures in Washington, D.C.
Monuments and memorials in Washington, D.C.
Stockton
Sculptures of men in Washington, D.C.